3 is the third studio album recorded by the French singer and songwriter Calogero. It was released in 2004 and achieved smash success, becoming the second best-selling album of the year in France.

Album information
The album, for which all the music was composed by Calogero, was written by several artists, such as Lionel Florence (who had already worked with Pascal Obispo, Patricia Kaas and Nolwenn Leroy), Zazie, Raphael and Calogero's brother, Gioacchino. The R&B duet with Passi on "Face à la mer", was the most successful single from this album. The single "Si seulement je pouvais lui manquer" is dedicated to Calogero's father, and the last track, "La Bienvenue", is a tribute his daughter who was born shortly before.

The album was charted for two years in France and Belgium (Wallonia), topping their chart, and achieved success in Switzerland, and hitting Platinum certifications in these countries.

3 was released as a CD, but there was also a collector edition composing of a CD and a DVD on which there is an interview of Calogero. There were three singles from this album, but "Yalla" was just a promotional single, while the two others were top ten hits in France and Belgium (Wallonia).

The album was also simultaneously released on hybrid stereo/multichannel Super Audio CD. In 2013 the high resolution stereo version was repurposed as a 24/96 download for Qobuz and other providers, and both the stereo and surround programmes were used to make a High Fidelity Pure Audio Blu-ray disc.

Track listing
 CD

 DVD
Making of

Credits
 Tracks 2, 3, 5, 6, 8, 9, 11, 12 :
 Produced by Philippe Uminski and Calogero
 Recorded and mixed by Erwin Autrique at studios ICP
 Tracks 1, 4, 7, 10 :
 Produced by Pierre Jaconelli and Calogero
 Recorded by Pete Schwier at studio Gang
 Assistant : Florian Lagatta
 Mixed by Erwin Autrique at studios ICP TBC
Except "Si seulement je pouvais lui manquer" : mixed by Pete Schwier ; "Je n'ai que nous à vivre" : mixed by Pete Schwier and Erwin Autrique
 Passi's voice on "Face à la mer" recorded by Philippe Balzé, Vincent Creusot, at studio plus XXX
 Strings recorded at studios Ferber by René Ameline, assisted by Laurent Binder, and at studios Méga by Patrice Kung, assisted by Dimitri Kurts, with Les Archers de Paris and L'Orchestre de Massy
 Additional recordings : Michel Dierickx, Phil Delire at studio ICP
 Mastering George Marino at Sterling Sound
 Artistic direction : Caroline Molko
 Executive production : Sandrine Lebars
 Photos : Kate Barry
 Photos patchwork : André D.
 Artwork : Autrement Le Design'

Charts and sales

Weekly charts

Year-end charts

Certifications

References

2004 albums
Calogero (singer) albums